Not So Much a Programme, More a Way of Life (commonly abbreviated to NSMAPMAWOL, pronounced ens-map-may-wall and stylised as Not so much a programme, more a way of Life) is a BBC-TV satire programme produced by Ned Sherrin, which aired during the winter of 1964–1965, in an attempt to continue and improve on the successful formula of his That Was the Week That Was (known informally as TW3), which had been taken off by the BBC because of a forthcoming general election. As was the case with TW3, NSMAPMAWOL featured David Frost as compère.  In the early part of the show's run, two others, William Rushton (as he was billed at the time) and the poet P. J. Kavanagh joined Frost in the role. For the final few months of the series, only David Frost was hosting the show. In addition to Saturdays, there were also editions on Fridays and Sundays.

NSMAPMAWOL saw the first appearances on television of John Bird, Eleanor Bron, Roy Hudd, and John Fortune. Michael Crawford also featured as 'Byron'. The format alternated satire with chat; the trio of hosts were joined by three guests including regulars Patrick Campbell, Gerald Kaufman and Harvey Orkin.

Whereas TW3 had had a dark nightclub atmosphere, the new programme used predominantly white sets. The theme tune was sung by Lynda Baron.

NSMAPMAWOL lacked the impact of TW3 and lasted only one series before being replaced  by the Robert Robinson-fronted BBC-3 (which aired once a week).

References

External links 
 

BBC Television shows
1960s British satirical television series
BBC television sketch shows
1964 British television series debuts
1965 British television series endings
1960s British television sketch shows
English-language television shows